The 2008 New Zealand bravery awards were announced via a special honours list on 3 May 2008, and recognised five people for acts of bravery between 2004 and 2006. In March 2023, two further awards, to police officers Eric Tibbott and Allister Rose, previously not made public for security reasons relating to the New Zealand Police, were published.

New Zealand Bravery Star (NZBS)
 Taufui Aevalu Paea – of Glenfield.

 Eric Ivan John Tibbott – sergeant, New Zealand Police.
 Allister Graham Rose – constable, New Zealand Police.

New Zealand Bravery Decoration (NZBD)
 Robert Bruce Gibson – constable, New Zealand Police.
 Karl Hugh Pennington – constable, New Zealand Police.

New Zealand Bravery Medal (NZBM)
 Roger William Bright – senior constable, New Zealand Police.

 George Allan Stewart – senior sergeant, New Zealand Police.

References

Bravery
Bravery awards
New Zealand bravery awards